Byzantinism, or Byzantism, is the political system and culture of the Byzantine Empire, and its spiritual successors  the Orthodox Christian Balkan countries of Greece and Bulgaria especially, and to a lesser extent Serbia and some other Orthodox countries in Eastern Europe like Belarus, Georgia, Russia and Ukraine. The term byzantinism itself was coined in the 19th century. The term has primarily negative associations, implying complexity and autocracy.

This negative reputation stressed the confusing complexities of the Empire's ministries and the elaborateness of its court ceremonies. Likewise, the "Byzantine system" also suggests a penchant for intrigue, plots and assassinations and an overall unstable political state of affairs. The term has been criticized by modern scholars for being a generalization that is not very representative of the reality of the Byzantine aristocracy and bureaucracy.

Aristocracy and bureaucracy

The Byzantine Empire is a modern term applied by Westerners to the Eastern Roman Empire (that survived a thousand years after the western one collapsed in 476) and thus had a complex system of aristocracy and bureaucracy which was derived from earlier Roman systems. At the apex of the pyramid stood the Emperor, sole ruler and divinely ordained, and beneath him a multitude of officials and court functionaries operated the administrative machinery of the state. A key component of state power was the prestige of the Imperial institution and its long antiquity. Ceremony and the granting of both honorific titles and valuable offices was therefore extensive and elaborate.

Over the nearly fifteen hundred years of the empire's existence, different titles were adopted and discarded, and many lost or gained prestige. By the time of Heraclius in the 7th century many of the early Roman titles, grounded in the Latin language and the traditions of the old Roman republic had become obsolete in the now mostly Greek-speaking empire, although Latin survived longer in law and in the military. Heraclius formally changed the official language to Greek from Latin in 610. Titles inspired by their Greek tradition, often only rough approximation of Latin concepts, became common (i.e. "basileus" [βασιλεύς] instead of "caesar" or "augustus" for the title of the emperor himself). Other titles changed meaning (for example, "Patriarch") or were devalued with time (such as "consul").

Among important qualities of the Empire was also the caesaropapism, the subjugation of church to the state.

Byzantinism in Germany 

According to the Polish historian Feliks Koneczny, German culture is deeply rooted in Byzantinism, a phenomenon he calls German Byzantinism. It started with the formation of the Holy Roman Empire and the adaptation of Byzantine theories concerning political rule to German lands by Otto I and subsequent Holy Roman Emperors.

Criticism
The Byzantine Empire acquired a negative reputation in the Western world as early as the Middle Ages. The creation of the Holy Roman Empire by Charlemagne in the 9th century and the East–West Schism in the 11th century made the Empire an outcast to the Western European countries following the Roman Church, and the siege and sack of Constantinopole during the Fourth Crusade in 1204 only cemented those differences. Hence the European medieval stereotypes of the people of the Byzantine Empire portrayed them as perfidious, treacherous, servile, effeminate and unwarlike.

Medievalist Steven Runciman described the medieval European view of the Byzantine Empire by saying:

Criticism of the Empire continued among historians of the 18th century and 19th century, particularly in the works of historians and philosophers influenced by The Enlightenment. Edward Gibbon, Hegel, Johann Gottfried Herder, William Lecky, Montesquieu, and Voltaire were among the many Western writers of that period who were critical of the Byzantine system.

Edward Gibbon, the first English historian to write a full history of the Byzantine Empire in his The History of the Decline and Fall of the Roman Empire (1776–1789), was a sharp critic of the Empire. Jacob Burckhardt, an influential 19th-century historian shared Gibbon's view:

Critics pointed out that the Byzantine Empire and its successors were uninfluenced by such major shifts in Western philosophy as the Investiture Controversy, the Reformation and the Renaissance; and reduced the Byzantine political culture to caesaropapism and authoritarian political culture, described as authoritarian, despotic, and imperialistic.

After the fall of the Byzantine Empire, critics of the Byzantine system pointed out that it has survived and "corrupted" other states, in particular, it has been used in the discourse of the political system, culture and society of Russia (from the times of the Grand Duchy of Moscow through the tsardom of Russia to the Russian Empire – see also tsarist autocracy), the Soviet Union, the Ottoman Empire and the Balkan states (the former European provinces of the Ottoman Empire).

Modern historians point out that this negative reputation is not necessarily true, and at the very least, a very simplistic generalization. As a constructed term, Byzantinism also shares those fallacies with a closely related term, Balkanism. Angelov sums it up as follows:

Praise
While the Byzantine Empire was commonly seen in a negative fashion, there were exceptions. Byzantium was rehabilitated in France during the Age of Absolutism, from the 17th century to the French Revolution, in the works of such individuals as the Jesuit Pierre Poussines.

As the Enlightenment swept Western Europe, French traditions found refuge in the Russian Empire. The term Byzantinism was used in a positive context by 19th-century Russian scholar Konstantin Leontiev in Byzantism and Slavdom (1875) to describe the type of society which the Russian Empire needed to counter the "degenerating influence" of the West. Leontiev praised the Byzantine Empire and the tsarist autocracy, and a society and political system that comprises authoritative power of the monarch, devout following of the Russian Orthodox Church, the maintenance of obshchina for peasants, and sharp class division; he also criticized universal education and democracy.

In Russian political discourse, Russia is sometimes affectionately called Third Rome, the second Rome being the Eastern Roman Empire, which outlived its western counterpart at Rome itself, the first Rome, by a thousand years.

In his article, "Was There Ever Byzantinism?" Alexander Mirkovic argued that many Western authors have created an imagined picture of Byzantium as a projection of their own anxieties.

Some scholars focused on the positive aspects of Byzantine culture and legacy, French historian Charles Diehl described the Byzantine Empire by saying:

Historian Averil Cameron regards as undeniable the Byzantine contribution to the formation of medieval Europe, and both Cameron and Dimitri Obolensky recognise the major role of Byzantium in shaping Orthodoxy, which in turn occupies a central position in the history, societies and culture of Greece, Romania, Bulgaria, Russia, Georgia, Serbia and other countries. The Byzantines also preserved and copied classical manuscripts, and they are thus regarded as transmitters of classical knowledge, as important contributors to modern European civilisation, and as precursors of both Renaissance humanism and Slavic-Orthodox culture.

Modern discourse
In a modern context it can be used to denote undemocratic practices and the use of violence in political life; it has been often used in the context of South-Eastern European (Balkan) politics. The "baggage" of Byzantine tradition is used to explain the delays in developing democratic institutions, the preference for the strong, even autocratic governments, people's distrust of businessmen and elected politicians, and overall, to explain the difference between the West and South-East and Eastern Europe. The word "Byzantinism" and related, like "Byzantine", have acquired negative connotations in several West European languages, including the English language.

See also

References

Sources
 
 

19th-century neologisms
Balkans
Byzantine Empire
Politics of the Russian Empire
Politics of the Ottoman Empire
Political theories
Philosophical theories